Pak Song-chol (born 24 September 1987) is a North Korean international football player who plays for Visakha.

Pak has appeared for the Korea DPR national football team in the 2010 FIFA World Cup rounds. He also played at the 2007 FIFA U-20 World Cup.

Career statistics

International

Statistics accurate as of match played on 18 January 2015

Goals for senior national team

References

External links

1987 births
Living people
North Korean footballers
North Korea international footballers
Rimyongsu Sports Club players
2015 AFC Asian Cup players
Footballers at the 2010 Asian Games
Expatriate footballers in Cambodia
Association football midfielders
Asian Games competitors for North Korea